Shestaki is a rural locality (a settlement) in Gubakhinsky Urban okrug, Perm Krai, Russia. The population was 66 as of 2010. There are 7 streets.

References 

Rural localities in Perm Krai